Mihi  is a village development committee in Mugu District in the Karnali Zone of north-western Nepal. At the time of the 1991 Nepal census it had a population of 898 people living in 181 individual households.

References

External links
UN map of the municipalities of Mugu District

Populated places in Mugu District